Dodge and Burn is the third studio album by the American rock band the Dead Weather. It was released worldwide on September 25, 2015, through Third Man Records.

Background and release
In October 2013, Third Man Records announced the forthcoming release of a limited edition 7-inch vinyl record containing two newly recorded Dead Weather songs. "Open Up (That's Enough)" and its B-side, "Rough Detective," were released exclusively in this format through the label's record subscription service, The Vault. These two tracks were the first pair of songs to be released in vinyl-only physical form through The Vault. "Buzzkill(er)" and "It's Just Too Bad" were released in similar fashion on November 4, 2014. These four songs and eight others would make up the band's third studio album, Dodge and Burn. The songs were recorded from approximately July 2014 to July 2015 when members of the band had the available time or inspiration to record. The third single in advance of the album, "I Feel Love (Every Million Miles)," was made available for download on August 21, 2015. It was released on 7-inch vinyl, backed with "Cop and Go," through The Vault in September 2015.

Track listing

Personnel
The Dead Weather
Alison Mosshart – vocals
Jack Lawrence – bass, backing vocals
Jack White – drums, vocals , guitar , cowbell , percussion , production, mixing
Dean Fertita – guitar, keyboards, backing vocals; piano , sequencing

Additional musicians
Joshua V. Smith – cowbell
Katelyn Westergard – violin
Kristin Weber – violin
Elizabeth Lamb – viola
Cara Fox – cello

Additional personnel
Joshua V. Smith – engineering, mixing
Vance Powell – engineering
John Hampton – engineering
Mindy Watts – assistant recording engineer
Lydia Gilman – assistant recording engineer
Dusy Fairchild – assistant recording engineer, mixing engineer
Lars Fox – additional editing
Brooke Waggoner – string quartet arrangement 
Bob Ludwig – mastering

Charts

References

External links
Official website

2015 albums
The Dead Weather albums
Albums produced by Jack White
Third Man Records albums